was a town located in Toyoura District, Yamaguchi Prefecture, Japan.

On February 13, 2005, Kikugawa, along with the towns of Hōhoku, Toyoura and Toyota (all from Toyoura District), were merged into the expanded city of Shimonoseki.

Population 
As of 2003, the town had an estimated population of 8,218 and a density of 98.09 persons per km². The total area was 83.78 km².

External links
 Shimonoseki official website 

Dissolved municipalities of Yamaguchi Prefecture